Kubica is the family name of:

 Andrzej Kubica (born 1972), Polish football player
 Ján Kubica (born 1973), Slovak sprint canoer
 Krzysztof Kubica, Polish football player
 Lubomír Kubica (born 1979), Czech football player
 Mikołaj Kubica (1945–2020), Polish gymnast
 Robert Kubica (born 1984), Polish racing driver
 Zdeněk Kubica (born 1986), Czech ice hockey player

Polish-language surnames
West Slavic-language surnames